

August Hinrich Dieckmann (29 May 1912 – 10 October 1943) was a commander in the Waffen-SS of Nazi Germany during World War II. He was a recipient of the Knight's Cross of the Iron Cross with Oak Leaves and Swords.

Awards
SS Degen (13 September 1936)
Iron Cross (1939)  2nd Class (28 September 1939) & 1st Class (3 June 1940)
German Cross in Gold on 28 February 1942 as SS-Sturmbannführer in the I./SS-Regiment "Germania"
Knight's Cross of the Iron Cross with Oak Leaves and Swords
 Knight's Cross on 23 April 1942 as SS-Sturmbannführer and commander of the I./SS-Regiment "Germania"
 233rd Oak Leaves on 16 April 1943 as SS-Sturmbannführer and commander of the I./SS-Panzergrenadier-Regiment "Germania"
 39th Swords on 10 October 1943 (posthumous) as SS-Obersturmbannführer and commander of SS-Panzergrenadier-Regiment 10 "Westland"

References

Citations

Bibliography

 
 
 
 
 

1912 births
1943 deaths
SS-Standartenführer
Recipients of the Gold German Cross
Recipients of the Knight's Cross of the Iron Cross with Oak Leaves and Swords
Waffen-SS personnel killed in action
People from Cuxhaven
Military personnel from Lower Saxony